The 1904 Carlisle Indians football team represented the Carlisle Indian Industrial School as an independent during the 1904 college football season. Led by Eddie Rogers in his first and only season as head coach, the Indians compiled a record of 10–2 and outscored opponents 347to 44.

The school started their program in 1895 and began playing against Ivy League schools. Within the next twenty years they became one of the strongest football teams in the country.

Schedule

References

Carlisle
Carlisle Indians football seasons
Carlisle Football